Ognen Cove (‘Zaliv Ognen’ \'za-liv 'og-nen\) is the 2.8 km wide cove indenting for 1.55 km the northwest coast of Trinity Peninsula in Graham Land, Antarctica. It is part of Charcot Bay entered west of Nikyup Point, and formed as a result of the retreat of Andrew Glacier in the second half of 20th century.

The cove is named after the settlement of Ognen in Southeastern Bulgaria.

Location
German-British mapping in 1996.

Maps
 Trinity Peninsula. Scale 1:250000 topographic map No. 5697. Institut für Angewandte Geodäsie and British Antarctic Survey, 1996.
 Antarctic Digital Database (ADD). Scale 1:250000 topographic map of Antarctica. Scientific Committee on Antarctic Research (SCAR), 1993–2016.

References
 Bulgarian Antarctic Gazetteer. Antarctic Place-names Commission. (details in Bulgarian, basic data in English)
Ognen Cove. SCAR Composite Antarctic Gazetteer.

External links
 Ognen Cove. Copernix satellite image

Landforms of Trinity Peninsula
Bulgaria and the Antarctic